Friedrich Siegmund Georg Freiherr Kress von Kressenstein (also ; 24 April 1870 – 16 October 1948) was a German general from Nuremberg. He was a member of the group of German officers who assisted in the direction of the Ottoman Army during World War I. Kress von Kressenstein was part of the military mission of Otto Liman von Sanders to the Ottoman Empire, which arrived shortly before World War I broke out. He was also the main leader for the Ottoman Desert Command Force (DCF).

Early life 
Kress came from a patrician family in Nuremberg. His father, Georg Kress von Kressenstein (1840–1911), was a high court judge. Kress von Kressenstein joined the Bavarian army as an ensign in the artillery in 1888. He was appointed as Second Lieutenant on 6 March 1890. On 1 October 1895, he joined the Bavarian War Academy and graduated in September 1898. He continued his general staff education until 1914. With Otto Liman von Sanders, Kressenstein was sent to Ottoman Empire and served as the commander of the Ottoman field artillery school.

World War I

Palestine

Kress joined Djemal Pasha's army in Palestine as a military engineer and was later chief of staff. Djemal Pasha was given the job by the war minister Enver Pasha of capturing or disabling the Suez Canal. This effort is called the First Suez Offensive, and it occurred in January 1915. Kress von Kressenstein was responsible for creating special boats for crossing the canal (pontoons) as well as organizing the crossing of the Sinai desert. While the desert was crossed with little loss of life, the British were aware of their approach and their attack on the Suez came as no surprise to the defenders. The Ottoman forces were repulsed easily and after two days of fighting, they retreated. Kress von Kressenstein's special pontoons were never used.

More than a year passed when the Ottomans tried a second attack on the Suez. With Djemal Pasha directing affairs from his base in Damascus, Kress von Kressenstein led a larger Ottoman army across the Sinai desert, again. The Ottoman army prepared a major set-piece assault on Romani, scheduled for 3 August 1916 (see the Battle of Romani for a detailed description). The attack was beaten off and again the Ottomans retreated back to their bases in Palestine.

The British responded with an attack of their own. They captured some small Ottoman forts in the Sinai, built a railroad and water pipe across the desert and then launched an assault on the Ottoman fort at Gaza. Kress von Kressenstein was in charge of the Ottoman defences along with General Tala Bey. In the First Battle of Gaza (March 1917), the British were defeated, largely due to their own errors. In the Second Battle of Gaza in April 1917, the British were defeated again, the credit for this victory largely going to Kress von Kressenstein.

The British removed their unsuccessful generals and replaced them with General Allenby. The Ottomans also replaced their top leadership, bringing in the former Chief of the German General Staff, General von Falkenhayn. Kress von Kressenstein was kept on as commander of the Ottoman 8th Army defending Gaza and he was also awarded Prussia's highest order, the Pour le Mérite.

In November 1917, the British under General Allenby breached the Ottoman defensive positions at the Battle of Beersheba and the Third Battle of Gaza. Kress von Kressenstein was able to withdraw his defeated troops in fairly good order to new defensive positions in the north.

Caucasus

In the middle of 1918, with the Ottoman-German alliance breaking down, Kress von Kressenstein was sent with a small German force to Georgia, that was protected by Germany after its independence. He helped to frustrate the Red Army's invasion of the Georgian region Abkhazia.

Later life
Kress von Kressenstein retired from the German army in 1929 and died in Munich in 1948.

He wrote in several articles about his experiences in Palestine and the Caucasus, and published in 1938 a full book about the war in the Sinai and Palestine. 

At least two of his articles have been translated to English. 'The Campaign in Palestine from the Enemy's Side', published in the Royal United Services Institute Journal, and his 1936 article about the 'war in the desert', in which he discussed also the use of poison gas in the war, both in the Sinai Desert during WW1 and in the Italian conquest of Ethiopia (called Abyssinia at the time). His memoirs My Mission in Caucasus were published posthumously in 2001 in Tbilisi, Georgia.

In Popular Culture
He was played by Ralph Cotterill in the film The Lighthorsemen (1987).

Decorations and awards
 Pour le Mérite (Prussia)
 Knight of the Military Order of Max Joseph (Bavaria)
 Officer of the Order of Military Merit (Bavaria)
 Knight of the House Order of Hohenzollern
 Iron Cross of 1914, 1st and 2rd class (Prussia)
 Military Merit Cross, 3rd class with war decoration (Austria-Hungary)
 Imtiyaz Medal With Swords and Clasp (Ottoman Empire)
 Order of the Medjidie, 4th class (Ottoman Empire)
 Gallipoli Star, (Ottoman Empire)

See also
 Sinai and Palestine Campaign

Notes

 
 "Kress" is part of the family name, not a given name; hence, "Kress von Kressenstein" is the full family, or last, name.

References

Bibliography
 Fromkin, David (1989). A Peace to End All Peace. Avon Books.

External links
 
 "Biography of Kreß von Kressenstein from First World War.com" (downloaded January 9, 2006)
 "The Great War and the only Triumphant Campaign of 1917"  About Allenby's Palestine campaign of 1917 (downloaded January 9, 2006; link updated 10/20/2011)
 "Journal of the T. E. Lawrence Society – Autumn 1997" Lists Von Kressenstein's monograph on the campaign.

Online version of My Mission in Caucasus with document appendix 

1870 births
1948 deaths
Military personnel from Nuremberg
People from the Kingdom of Bavaria
Generals of Artillery (Reichswehr)
German Army personnel of World War I
Ottoman military personnel of World War I
Barons of Germany
Military personnel of Bavaria
Recipients of the Pour le Mérite (military class)
Commanders of the Military Order of Max Joseph
Officers Crosses of the Military Merit Order (Bavaria)
Recipients of the Order of the Medjidie, 4th class
Witnesses of the Armenian genocide